The Ocypodidae are a family of semiterrestrial crabs that includes the ghost crabs and fiddler crabs. They are found on tropical and temperate shorelines around the world.

Some genera previously included in the family are now treated as members of separate families in the superfamily Ocypodoidea, such as the Dotillidae and Macrophthalmidae. In 2016, the genus Uca was split into 13 genera by elevating its subgenera to genus rank, among other things. Further refinements have been made to the organization of the family, which has 4 subfamilies, about 13 extant genera, and about 180 described species as of 2020.

The majority of the Ocypodidae species are fiddler crabs, the exceptions being the members of the genus Ocypode, ghost crabs, and the genus Ucides, mangrove crabs.

Genera
These genera belong to the family Ocypodidae:

 Afruca Crane, 1975
 Austruca Bott, 1973
 Cranuca Beinlich & von Hagen, 2006
 Gelasimus Stimpson 1862
 Leptuca Bott, 1973
 Minuca Bott, 1954
 Ocypode Weber, 1795 - (ghost crabs)
 Paraleptuca Bott, 1973
 Petruca N.g.Shih & Christy, 2015
 Tubuca Bott, 1973
 Uca Leach, 1814
 Ucides Rathbun, 1897 - (mangrove crabs)
 Xeruca Shih, 2015
 † Chondromaia Feldmann, et al., 2013
 † Eoinachoides Van Straelan, 1933
 † Micromaia Bittner, 1875
 † Mithracia Bell, 1858
 † Nanomaja Müller & Collins, 1991
 † Panticarcinus Collins & Saward, 2006
 † Periacanthus Bittner, 1875
 † Pisomaja Lorenthey, 1929
 † Wilsonimaia Blow & Manning, 1996

References

Further reading

 

Ocypodoidea
Taxa named by Constantine Samuel Rafinesque
Decapod families